Courts of Oklahoma include:
;State courts of Oklahoma
Oklahoma Supreme Court (civil)
Oklahoma Court of Criminal Appeals (criminal)
Oklahoma Court of Civil Appeals
Oklahoma District Courts (26 judicial districts with 77 district courts)
Oklahoma Workers' Compensation Court

Federal courts located in Oklahoma
United States District Court for the Eastern District of Oklahoma
United States District Court for the Northern District of Oklahoma
United States District Court for the Western District of Oklahoma

References

External links
National Center for State Courts – directory of state court websites.

Courts in the United States